Mohammad Shafiq (variants: Mohammed, Muhammad, Shafik, Shafeek, Shafeeq, Shafique, Shafic, Chafic) may refer to
Mohammad Shafiq (born 1934), Pakistan Army soldier 
Mohammad Musa Shafiq (1932–1979), Prime Minister of Afghanistan 
Muhammad Shafiq (born 1953), Pakistani handball administrator
Mohammed Shafiq (born 1979), English-born chief executive of the Ramadhan Foundation 
Muhammad Shafiq Jamal (born 1987), Malaysian Footballer 
Mohammad Shafiq Hamdam, writer and a political activist in Afghanistan